A photonic integrated circuit (PIC) or integrated optical circuit is a microchip containing two or more photonic components which form a functioning circuit. This technology detects, generates, transports, and processes light. Photonic integrated circuits utilize photons (or particles of light) as opposed to electrons that are utilized by electronic integrated circuits. The major difference between the two is that a photonic integrated circuit provides functions for information signals imposed on optical wavelengths typically in the visible spectrum or near infrared (850–1650 nm).

The most commercially utilized material platform for photonic integrated circuits is indium phosphide (InP), which allows for the integration of various optically active and passive functions on the same chip. Initial examples of photonic integrated circuits were simple 2-section distributed Bragg reflector (DBR) lasers, consisting of two independently controlled device sections – a gain section and a DBR mirror section. Consequently, all modern monolithic tunable lasers, widely tunable lasers, externally modulated lasers and transmitters, integrated receivers, etc. are examples of photonic integrated circuits. As of 2012, devices integrate hundreds of functions onto a single chip.  
Pioneering work in this arena was performed at Bell Laboratories. The most notable academic centers of excellence of photonic integrated circuits in InP are the University of California at Santa Barbara, USA, the Eindhoven University of Technology and the University of Twente in the Netherlands.

A 2005 development showed that silicon can, even though it is an indirect bandgap material, still be used to generate laser light via the Raman nonlinearity. Such lasers are not electrically driven but optically driven and therefore still necessitate a further optical pump laser source.

History 
Photonics is the science behind the detection, generation, and manipulation of photons. According to quantum mechanics and the concept of wave-particle duality first proposed by Albert Einstein in 1905, light acts as both an electromagnetic wave and a particle. For example, total internal reflection in an optical fibre allows it to act as a waveguide.

Integrated circuits using electrical components were first developed in the late 1940s and early 1950s, but it took until 1958 for them to become commercially available. When the laser and laser diode were invented in the 1960s, the term ‘photonics’ fell into more common usage to describe the application of light to replace applications previously achieved through the use of electronics.

By the 1980s, photonics gained traction through its role in fibre optic communication. At the start of the decade, an assistant in a new research group at Delft University Of Technology, Meint Smit, started pioneering in the field of integrated photonics. He is credited with inventing the Arrayed Waveguide Grating (AWG): a core component of modern digital connections for the Internet and phones. Smit has received several awards, including an ERC Advanced Grant, a Rank Prize for Optoelectronics and a LEOS Technical Achievement Award.

Thanks to the pioneering work of both Meint Smit and Ton Backx over the last few decades, the Dutch integrated photonics sector has risen to prominence. Backx has been appointed Knight in the Order of the Netherlands Lion for among others his role in reforming the Department of Electrical Engineering at Eindhoven University of Technology and in founding both the Institute of Photonic Integration and PhotonDelta.

In October 2022, during an experiment held at the Technical University of Denmark in Copenhagen, a photonic chip transmitted 1.84 petabits of data over a fibre optic cable more than 7.9 kilometres long. First, the data stream was split into 37 sections, each of which was sent down a separate core of the fibre-optic cable. Next, each of these channels was split into 223 parts corresponding to equidistant spikes of light across the spectrum.

Comparison to electronic integration
Unlike electronic integration where silicon is the dominant material, system photonic integrated circuits have been fabricated from a variety of material systems, including electro-optic crystals such as lithium niobate, silica on silicon, silicon on insulator, various polymers and semiconductor materials which are used to make semiconductor lasers such as GaAs and InP. The different material systems are used because they each provide different advantages and limitations depending on the function to be integrated. For instance, silica (silicon dioxide) based PICs have very desirable properties for passive photonic circuits such as AWGs (see below) due to their comparatively low losses and low thermal sensitivity, GaAs or InP based PICs allow the direct integration of light sources and Silicon PICs enable co-integration of the photonics with transistor based electronics.

The fabrication techniques are similar to those used in electronic integrated circuits in which photolithography is used to pattern wafers for etching and material deposition. Unlike electronics where the primary device is the transistor, there is no single dominant device. The range of devices required on a chip includes low loss interconnect waveguides, power splitters, optical amplifiers, optical modulators, filters, lasers and detectors. These devices require a variety of different materials and fabrication techniques making  it difficult to realize all of them on a single chip.

Newer techniques using resonant photonic interferometry is making way for UV LEDs to be used for optical computing requirements with much cheaper costs leading the way to petahertz consumer electronics.

Examples of photonic integrated circuits
The primary application for photonic integrated circuits is in the area of fiber-optic communication though applications in other fields such as biomedical and photonic computing are also possible.

The arrayed waveguide grating (AWG) which are commonly used as optical (de)multiplexers in wavelength division multiplexed (WDM) fiber-optic communication systems are an example of a photonic integrated circuit which has replaced previous multiplexing schemes which utilized multiple discrete filter elements. Since separating optical modes is a need for quantum computing, this technology may be helpful to miniaturize quantum computers (see linear optical quantum computing).

Another example of a photonic integrated chip in wide use today in fiber-optic communication systems is the externally modulated laser (EML) which combines a distributed feed back laser diode with an electro-absorption modulator on a single InP based chip.

Applications 
As global data consumption rises and demand for faster networks continues to grow, the world needs to find more sustainable solutions to the energy crisis and climate change. At the same time, ever more innovative applications for sensor technology, such as Lidar in autonomous driving vehicles, appear on the market. There is a need to keep pace with technological challenges.

The expansion of 5G data networks and data centres, safer autonomous driving vehicles, and more efficient food production cannot be sustainably met by electronic microchip technology alone. However, combining electrical devices with integrated photonics provides a more energy efficient way to increase the speed and capacity of data networks, reduce costs and meet an increasingly diverse range of needs across various industries.

Data and telecommunications 
The primary application for PICs is in the area of fibre-optic communication. The arrayed waveguide grating (AWG) which are commonly used as optical (de)multiplexers in wavelength division multiplexed (WDM) fibre-optic communication systems are an example of a photonic integrated circuit. Another example in fibre-optic communication systems is the externally modulated laser (EML) which combines a distributed feedback laser diode with an electro-absorption modulator. For instance, EFFECT Photonics develops affordable and high-performance optical communications solutions, such as SPF+ optical transceivers, which help meet the demand for bandwidth and faster data transfer.

The PICs can also increase bandwidth and data transfer speeds by deploying few-modes optical planar waveguides. Especially, if modes can be easily converted from conventional single-mode planar waveguides into few-mode waveguides, and selectively excite the desired modes. For example, a bidirectional spatial mode slicer and combiner can be used to achieve the desired higher or lower-order modes. Its principle of operation depends on cascading stages of V-shape and/ or M-shape graded-index planar waveguides.

Not only can PICs increase bandwidth and data transfer speeds, they can reduce energy consumption in data centres, which spend a large proportion of energy on cooling servers. Compared with solely electronic solutions, PICs generate far less heat and can mitigate the need for cooling, reducing energy consumption. For example, QuiX Quantum develops quantum photonic processors which enable quantum photonic computers to operate at room temperature leading to a reduction in size and cost.

Healthcare and medicine 
Using advanced biosensors and creating more affordable diagnostic biomedical instruments, integrated photonics opens the door to lab-on-a-chip (LOC) technology, cutting waiting times, and taking diagnosis out of laboratories and into the hands of doctors and patients. Based on an ultrasensitive photonic biosensor, SurfiX Diagnostics’ diagnostics platform provides a variety of point-of-care tests. Similarly, Amazec Photonics has developed a fibre optic sensing technology with photonic chips which enables high-resolution temperature sensing (fractions of 0.1 milliKelvin) without having to inject the temperature sensor within the body. This way, medical specialists are able to measure both cardiac output and circulating blood volume from outside the body. Another example of optical sensor technology is EFI’s ‘OptiGrip’ device, which offers greater control over tissue feeling for minimal invasive surgery.

Automotive and engineering applications 
PICs can be applied in sensor systems, like Lidar (which stands for light detection and ranging), to monitor the surroundings of vehicles. It can also be deployed in-car connectivity through Li-Fi, which is similar to WiFi but uses light. This technology facilitates communication between vehicles and urban infrastructure to improve driver safety. For example, some modern vehicles pick up traffic signs and remind the driver of the speed limit.

In terms of engineering, fibre optic sensors can be used to detect different quantities, such as pressure, temperature, vibrations, accelerations, and mechanical strain. Sensing technology from PhotonFirst uses integrated photonics to measure things like shape changes in aeroplanes, electric vehicle battery temperature, and infrastructure strain.

Agriculture and food 
Sensors play a role in innovations in agriculture and the food industry in order to reduce wastage and detect diseases. Light sensing technology powered by PICs can measure variables beyond the range of the human eye, allowing the food supply chain to detect disease, ripeness and nutrients in fruit and plants. It can also help food producers to determine soil quality and plant growth, as well as measuring CO2 emissions. A new, miniaturised, near-infrared sensor, developed by MantiSpectra, is small enough to fit into a smartphone, and can be used to analyse chemical compounds of products like milk and plastics.

Types of fabrication and materials 
The fabrication techniques are similar to those used in electronic integrated circuits, in which photolithography is used to pattern wafers for etching and material deposition.

The platforms considered most versatile are indium phosphide (InP) and silicon photonics (SiPh):

 Indium phosphide (InP) PICs have active laser generation, amplification, control, and detection. This makes them an ideal component for communication and sensing applications.
 Silicon nitride (SiN) PICs have a vast spectral range and ultra low-loss waveguide. This makes them highly suited to detectors, spectrometers, biosensors, and quantum computers. The lowest propagation losses reported in SiN (0.1 dB/cm down to 0.1 dB/m) have been achieved by LioniX International's TriPleX waveguides.
 Silicon photonics (SiPh) PICs provide low losses for passive components like waveguides and can be used in minuscule photonic circuits. They are compatible with existing electronic fabrication.

The term "silicon photonics" actually refers to the technology rather than the material. It combines high density photonic integrated circuits (PICs) with complementary metal oxide semiconductor (CMOS) electronics fabrication. The most technologically mature and commercially used platform is silicon on insulator (SOI).

Other platforms include:

 Lithium niobate (LiNbO3) is an ideal modulator for low loss mode. It is highly effective at matching fibre input–output due to its low index and broad transparency window. For more complex PICs, lithium niobate can be formed into large crystals. As part of project ELENA, there is a European initiative to stimulate production of LiNbO3-PICs. Attempts are also being made to develop lithium niobate on insulator (LNOI).
 Silica has a low weight and small form factor. It is a common component of optical communication networks, such as planar light wave circuits (PLCs).
 Gallium arsenide (GaAS) has high electron mobility. This means GaAS transistors operate at high speeds, making them ideal analogue integrated circuit drivers for high speed lasers and modulators.

By combining and configuring different chip types (including existing electronic chips) in a hybrid or heterogeneous integration, it is possible to leverage the strengths of each. Taking this complementary approach to integration addresses the demand for increasingly sophisticated energy-efficient solutions.

Developers 
Public–private partnerships, such as PhotonDelta in Europe and the American Institute for Manufacturing Integrated Photonics in the United States, also provide end-to-end supply chains and ecosystems to help kickstart and scale companies working within integrated photonics.

There are a number of organisations specialising in different types of fabrication:

 Smart Photonics (Netherlands) is a foundry for indium phosphide (InP)
 Ligentec (Switzerland) is a foundry for silicon nitride (SiN)
 LioniX International (Netherlands) is an organisation specialising in silicon nitride (SiN)
 AMF (Singapore) and VTT (Finland) are foundries for silicon photonics (SiPh)
 GlobalFoundries (United States), and Tower Semiconductor (Israel) are foundries for silicon photonics (SiPh)
 Lightelligence, a 2017 startup that began at MIT.

Current status
As of 2010, photonic integration was an active topic in U.S. Defense contracts. It was included by the Optical Internetworking Forum for inclusion in 100 gigahertz optical networking standards.

See also 
 Optical computing
 Optical transistor
 Silicon photonics

Notes

References
 
 
 

 
 

Photonics
Optical components
Silicon photonics
Integrated circuits